The Aeromarine 90 hp was the first aircraft motor built by the Aeromarine Plane and Motor Company in 1914. In that year, Aeromarine had acquired the patents and manufacturing rights to the aircraft and engines of the Boland brothers. Although the Boland brothers didn't make a 6-cylinder engine, their V-8's all used the unusual concentric valve that is used in this engine. In spite of its model name, this engine only produced  at 1,400 rpm

Developments 
 Aeromarine K-6

Specifications

References

Further reading
 
 

1910s aircraft piston engines